Keith David Williams (born June 4, 1956) is an American actor. He is known for his signature deep voice and commanding screen presence in over 300 roles across film, stage, television, and interactive media.

He has starred in such films as The Thing (1982), Platoon (1986), They Live (1988), Dead Presidents (1995), Armageddon (1998), There's Something About Mary (1998), Requiem for a Dream (2000), Pitch Black (2000), Barbershop (2002), Crash (2004), The Chronicles of Riddick (2004), Cloud Atlas (2012), The Nice Guys (2016), and Nope (2022). He starred as Elroy Patashnik in the sixth season of the NBC series Community (2015) and starred as Bishop James Greenleaf in the Oprah Winfrey Network drama Greenleaf (2016–2020).

His Emmy-winning voice-over career includes work as the narrator of Ken Burns films such as The War (2007) and Muhammad Ali (2021). In film, characters that he has voiced include Dr. Facilier in The Princess and the Frog (2009) and the Cat in Coraline (2009). On television, he portrayed  Goliath on Gargoyles (1994–1997), Al Simmons / Spawn on Todd McFarlane's Spawn (1997–1999), The Flame King on Adventure Time (2012–2017), the President on Rick and Morty (2015–), and King Andrias on Amphibia (2020–2022). Video game roles include the Arbiter Thel 'Vadamee in the Halo franchise (2004–2015), Julius Little and himself in the Saints Row series (2006–2017),  Anderson in the Mass Effect series (2007–2013), Chaos in Dissidia Final Fantasy (2008), and Sergeant Foley in Call of Duty: Modern Warfare 2 (2009).

Early life and education
David was born June 4, 1956, in Harlem, New York City, and raised in Corona, Queens. His mother, Dolores (née Dickenson), was a manager at New York Telephone, and his father, Lester Williams, worked as a director of payroll operations.

He initially intended to become an actor after playing the Cowardly Lion in a school production of The Wizard of Oz and went on to study at Manhattan's High School of Performing Arts. He attended the Juilliard School's Drama Division (1975–1979, Group 8) where he graduated with a Bachelor of Fine Arts degree in 1979.

Career

Film and television 
In 1980–81, David toured the country with John Houseman's The Acting Company in productions of A Midsummer Night's Dream and Samuel Beckett's Waiting for Godot. Less than two years later, he went on to star as Childs, opposite Kurt Russell in John Carpenter's The Thing, starting his lengthy on-screen career. In the 1980s run of Mister Rogers' Neighborhood, he portrayed Keith the Southwood Carpenter in the Neighborhood of Make-Believe segments. He also played Keith, the game coin collector in an episode where Rogers and a small child learn to play the arcade game Donkey Kong.

He went on to appear in films such as Platoon, They Live, Men at Work, Marked for Death, and Stars and Bars. He played Kirby in the 1995 film Dead Presidents, and he appeared in the 1995 Spike Lee film Clockers. He followed this up with roles in other films such as Volcano,There's Something About Mary, Pitch Black, Barbershop, Agent Cody Banks, Head of State, Hollywood Homicide, Agent Cody Banks 2: Destination London,  The Chronicles of Riddick, Crash, ATL, Delta Farce and First Sunday.

He portrayed "Father" in the romantic comedy action film Mr. & Mrs. Smith. At the same time, he has appeared in numerous independent films including the critically acclaimed Requiem for a Dream, playing the role of Little John. He has also appeared extensively in television productions since the 1980s and as a regular character Lieutenant Williams on the short-lived television series The Job. He was a regular on another shoot made for ABC entitled The Big House in 2004. David portrayed Detective Jim Crenshaw in the 2010 horror film Chain Letter.

In 2010, David was cast as Max Malini for the NBC television series The Cape. On April 18, 2011, Keith appeared in the 21st episode of season one of Hawaii Five-0 as criminal tycoon Jimmy Cannon. In 2012, he appeared in the horror film Smiley and the science-fiction drama Cloud Atlas. In 2013, David appeared in the controversial drama Boiling Pot which is based on true events of racism. In 2014, David portrayed Command Sergeant Major Donald Cody in the Fox comedy series Enlisted. Later in 2014, David was cast as Elroy Patashnik in the sixth season of the sitcom Community.

In 2015, David was cast in the leading role alongside Lynn Whitfield in the Oprah Winfrey Network drama series Greenleaf.

Voice acting
David also works extensively as a voice actor, he was the voice of the Flame King in Adventure Time, Goliath from Gargoyles, the title character in the Spawn animated series, and Lemuel Kane in Archer. In the English dub of Princess Mononoke, David played the narrator and Okkoto. He played the role of Mama in the English dub of 3x3 Eyes. He provided the voice for the character Decker in the role-playing video game Fallout and the voice for the character Vhailor in Planescape: Torment. He provided the voice of the Arbiter for the video game Halo 2, released in 2004; later, he reprised that role in the Xbox 360 follow-up Halo 3. He portrayed the character again in Halo: The Master Chief Collection and also in Halo 5: Guardians, released in 2014 and 2015 respectively. He played the role of Captain David Anderson in BioWare's Mass Effect series.

David did voice work in the video game Saints Row and its sequel Saints Row II, playing gang leader of the 3rd Street Saints Julius Little, as well as voicing himself in Saints Row IV. 
He is also heard on the intro of several Ice Cube projects, including Westside Connection's 2003 release Terrorist Threats, Cube's 2008 solo album Raw Footage, Cube's 2010 solo album I Am the West, and he narrated the documentary Beef II, which also featured Ice Cube.

He provides the voice for the UPS "What Can Brown Do for You" commercials. He did the voice of Despero in the two part episode "Hearts and Minds" of Justice League. He has done voice work for early Adult Swim commercials for Inuyasha.

He has worked with documentary filmmaker Ken Burns numerous times, narrating Burns' Jazz, Mark Twain, The War, Unforgivable Blackness: The Rise and Fall of Jack Johnson, Jackie Robinson and Muhammad Ali.  David won the Emmy Award for Outstanding Voice-Over Performance for his work in The War and Unforgivable Blackness. He performs the narration duties in the BBC documentary, World War II: Behind Closed Doors.

The 2004 PBS documentary Ancient Refuge in the Holy Land and the 2005 History Channel documentary Crusades: Crescent & the Cross focusing on the medieval Crusades were both narrated by him, as well as the 2003 National Geographic documentary Inside Mecca. He later parodied his documentary work by narrating the 2012 episode of Community, "Pillows and Blankets", a mockumentary revolving around a pillow fight between rival blanket forts.

David has done voice-over work for many other documentaries including several for National Geographic and the documentary Comic Book Superheroes Unmasked for the History Channel. He replaced Paul Winfield as narrator for the A&E show City Confidential, taking over after Winfield's death in 2004. He voiced the trailer for the film Primeval, which was released in the United States on January 12, 2007.

David provided the voice of police detective Alex Cross for the audiobook versions of three novels by James Patterson: Cat and Mouse (1997), Pop Goes the Weasel (1999), and Roses are Red (2000). Other voice roles include Bebe Proud Clone from The Proud Family Movie, Atlas from Teen Titans, the lone renegade male gorilla Tublat in The Legend of Tarzan, and the Decepticon Barricade in Transformers: The Game.

He voiced Apollo the Sun God in Hercules, Council Member in Final Fantasy: The Spirits Within, the Black Cat in Coraline, Sergeant Foley in Call of Duty: Modern Warfare 2, Dr. Facilier in The Princess and the Frog, and the Big Man for The Spectacular Spider-Man episode "Survival of the Fittest".

On May 25, 2008, he narrated Kansas City's Celebration at the Station, a Memorial Day service held annually at the World War I Memorial across from Union Station. During the ceremony, he announced the attendance of Frank W. Buckles, the last living veteran of World War I. He was the voice of Frederick Douglass in the third episode of the PBS documentary God in America: How Religious Liberty Shaped America in 2010.

David returned to the Saints Row series in Saints Row IV, voicing a fictionalized version of himself as well as reprising Julius Little. He is the narrator of the History Channel series The Bible which premiered on March 3, 2013.

David voiced the superhero gorilla Solovar in the two-part Gorilla City episode of The Flash. Keith David also has a recurring role as the President of the United States in the adult animated series Rick and Morty.

David was the narrator of the MLB Network special Mr. Padre, the video biography of San Diego Padres Hall-of-Fame outfielder Tony Gwynn.

David has also narrated several WWE documentaries including The True Story of Wrestlemania and the 20 episodes of The Monday Night War, documenting the battle between WWE Raw and WCW Nitro.

David later recurred in Stargirl as the voice of Mister Bones.

Stage acting
In 1992, David received a Tony Award nomination for Best Supporting Actor in a Musical for his performance in Jelly's Last Jam. David received raves for his Shakespeare work on stage in Central Park, New York City. In 1995, he played the lead as Floyd "Schoolboy" Barton in August Wilson's Seven Guitars on Broadway. In 1995, David acted alongside Whitney Houston, Cedric the Entertainer, and Samuel E. Wright in the 1995 Apollo revival of The Wiz. In May 2006, he appeared in the musical Hot Feet on Broadway in New York. David appeared in the 2013 revival of August Wilson's Joe Turner's Come and Gone at the Mark Taper Theater in Los Angeles. Directed by Phylicia Rashad, he played the part of innkeeper Seth Holly.

His performance in Ebony Repertory Theatre's 2014 Paul Robeson by Phillip Hayes Dean previewed Wednesday, March 12, 2014, and opened on Friday, March 21, 2014.

From April 21, 2015, to May 10, 2015, Keith David starred as "Dolomite" in the off-Broadway play ToasT. The play (produced by Lemon Andersen and co-starred Hill Harper) was set in the Attica Prison around the time of its 1971 prison riot and told of the lives of its prisoners using poetic prose.

Personal life
He has married twice. He has one son from his first marriage and two daughters from his second marriage.

When asked in an interview on his narration work of The Bible if he was a religious man, he said: "I'm not a religious man. I'm a man of spirit. Religion can get political. I believe in God and spirit. I believe in church. I've been baptized. I've gone to Catholic, Baptist, Episcopal and Church of God in Christ."

During a live Twitter Q&A in 2017, David listed Dr. Facilier, Spawn, and Goliath as his three favorite voice roles.

Filmography

Film

Television

Video games

Theme parks

Theatre

References

Further reading
 Voisin, Scott. Character Kings: Hollywood's Familiar Faces Discuss the Art & Business of Acting. BearManor Media, 2009. .

External links

 
 
 
 

1956 births
Living people
African-American Christians
African-American male actors
African-American male singers
American baritones
American Christians
American male film actors
American male musical theatre actors
American male Shakespearean actors
American male stage actors
American male television actors
American male video game actors
American male voice actors
American producers
Audiobook narrators
Fiorello H. LaGuardia High School alumni
Juilliard School alumni
Male actors from New York City
Outstanding Narrator Primetime Emmy Award winners
People from Queens, New York
Primetime Emmy Award winners
20th-century American male actors
21st-century American male actors